Mo'ina Khojaeva (born 1941) is an Uzbekistani Tajik poet and short story writer.

Born in Samarkand, Khojaeva graduated from Samarkand State University in 1963, with a degree in Tajik language and literature; she then began teaching in schools in Samarkand. Her stories have appeared in publications such as Firuza, Sadoi Sharq, Jumhuriyyat, and Ovozi Tojik.

References

1941 births
Living people
20th-century Uzbekistani poets
Uzbekistani women poets
20th-century short story writers
Uzbekistani short story writers
Women short story writers
20th-century women writers
People from Samarkand
Ethnic Tajik people
20th-century Uzbekistani writers